The Morlach troops was an irregular military group in the Dalmatian hinterland, composed of Morlachs, that was hired by the Republic of Venice to fight the Ottoman Empire during the Cretan War (1645–69) and the Great Turkish War (1683–99).

Leaders
The leaders, called harambaša (tr. "bandit leader") and serdar ("commander-in-chief"), held several titles in Venetian service.

Cretan War
Stjepan Sorić, Catholic priest, "governator delli Morlachi"
Ilija Smiljanić, "governator principale"
Petar Smiljanić, "capo"
Vuk Mandušić, "capo direttore"
Janko Mitrović, "capo principale de Morlachi"
Šimun Bortulačić, "governator"
Jovan Dračevac, "governator"
Petronije Selaković, Orthodox monk

Etymology
Stanko Guldescu argued that the Vlachs or Morlachs, were Latin speaking and pastoral peoples who lived in the Balkan mountains since pre-Roman times Morlachs were Slavicized and partially Islamized during Turkish occupation. Silviu Dragomir wrote that the Vlachs were called Morlachs by Venetians and Velebit county was named Morlacca for a while and the naval channel in vicinity, the Velebit Channel was called "Canale della Morlacca"  Cicerone Poghirc showed that Morlach is an Italian translation of the Turkish name Caravlach. "Cara" means "Black" in Turkish but means North in Turkish geography. So Morlachs are Northern Vlachs in opposition with the Vlachs from Greece.

History
With the Cretan War (1645–69), a solid organization was needed, with an officer commanding over several harambaše. At first this position was undetermined. Priest Stjepan Sorić is mentioned as "governator delli Morlachi", Petar Smiljanić as "capo", Vuk Mandušić as "capo direttore", and Janko Mitrović as "capo principale de Morlachi", Jovan Dračevac as "governator" etc. This "Uskok" or "Morlach" army had less than 1,500 fighters.

Legacy
The rebel fighters are enumerated Serbian epic poetry, of which there is a cyclus.

See also
Morlachs
Vlachs of Croatia
Vlach (Ottoman social class)

References

Sources

Morlachs
Military units and formations of the Republic of Venice
Mercenary units and formations of the Early Modern era
16th- and 17th-century warrior types
Cretan War (1645–1669)
Great Turkish War
Venetian period in the history of Croatia
History of Dalmatia